Hartmut Nassauer (born 17 October 1942, in Marburg) is a German politician who served as a Member of the European Parliament for Hesse from 1994 until 2009. He is a member of the conservative Christian Democratic Union, part of the European People's Party.

References

1942 births
Living people
MEPs for Germany 2004–2009
Christian Democratic Union of Germany MEPs
MEPs for Germany 1999–2004
Commanders Crosses of the Order of Merit of the Federal Republic of Germany